Cameron Thurley (born 26 November 1981) is an Australian rules footballer who played for Geelong and the Kangaroos in the Australian Football League (AFL), Clarence Football Club in the Tasmanian Statewide League and the Tasmanian Devils in the Victorian Football League.

Thurley played for Clarence Football Club in the Statewide League in 2000, where he was dropped for the Grand Final against Northern Bombers.  He then joining the Tasmania Devils in the VFL in 2001. He was then drafted by the Geelong Football Club in the 2003 AFL draft with the 22nd selection. He played in two Wizard Cup Games in 2004 but failed to play a senior match in 2004 as Geelong made a Preliminary Final. He made his AFL debut in 2005, and played in seven games, kicking 12 goals, including four in his second game. He then decided to leave the Cats at the end of the 2005 season and was selected by the Kangaroos with the seventh selection of the 2006 Pre-season draft. He made his debut for the Kangaroos in the opening game of the season, but only managed five games for them before being delisted at the end of the 2006 season.

He returned to the Tasmanian Devils in 2007, but struggled for form and motivation before moving to the backline in 2008, where he starred, winning their best and fairest award.  When the Tasmanian Devils finished in 2008 he returned to the newly formed Tasmanian State League to play with Clarence.
He played a major role in helping Clarence to the 2009 TSL Premiership by playing inspiring football, in particular in the preliminary final against Burnie when he took a towering pack mark late in the final quarter.

References

External links

Geelong Football Club players
North Melbourne Football Club players
Tasmanian Devils Football Club players
Australian rules footballers from Tasmania
Living people
1981 births
Clarence Football Club players